"Kill the Lights" is a song by American recording artist Alex Newell and record producer DJ Cassidy, featuring additional contribution from guitarist Nile Rodgers. The disco song was featured on an episode of the HBO television series, Vinyl (2016), and later appeared on its accompanying extended plays and soundtrack. 

Another version of the song features English singer and songwriter Jess Glynne, and a set of remixes of this version by Audien, Yolanda Be Cool, Chuckie, and Dimitri from Paris was released as a single on April 15, 2016.

Music video
The music video for the song was released to YouTube on April 8, 2016.

Track listing

Charts

Weekly charts

Year-end charts

See also
List of number-one dance singles of 2016 (U.S.)

References

2016 songs
2016 singles
Atlantic Records singles
Dance-pop songs
Disco songs
DJ Cassidy songs
Jess Glynne songs
Songs from television series